Trochaic octameter is a poetic meter with eight trochaic metrical feet per line. Each foot has one stressed syllable followed by an unstressed syllable.  Trochaic octameter is a rarely used meter.

Description and uses
The best known work in trochaic octameter is Edgar Allan Poe's "The Raven", which uses five lines of trochaic octameter followed by a "short" half line (in reality, 7 beats). By the end of the poem, the latter half line takes on the qualities of a refrain.

Another well-known work is Banjo Paterson's "Clancy of the Overflow", which uses four lines of trochaic octameter for each verse throughout. Other examples are Robert Browning's A Toccata of Galuppi's, Alfred Tennyson's Locksley Hall, and Rudyard Kipling's Mandalay. Lines in these poems are catalectic (' x ' x ' x ' x ' x ' x ' x ' ).

A line of trochaic octameter is eight of these in a row:

We can scan this with a 'x' mark representing an unstressed syllable and a '/' mark representing a stressed syllable.  In this notation a line of trochaic octameter would look like this:

The following first verse from "The Raven" shows the use of trochaic octameter.  Note the heavy use of dactyls in the second and fifth line, which help to emphasize the more regular lines, and the use of strong accents to end the second, fourth and fifth lines, reinforcing the rhyme:

We can notate the scansion of this as follows:

In other literatures 
Trochaic octameter is popular in Polish and Czech literatures. It is because the main stress in Polish falls regularly on the penultimate syllable and in Czech on the first syllable. So all Polish and Czech two-syllable words are trochaic.

Niedostępna ludzkim oczom, że nikt po niej się nie błąka,
W swym bezpieczu szmaragdowym rozkwitała w bezmiar łąka
(Bolesław Leśmian, Ballada bezludna)

Stojím v šeru na skalině, o niž v pěnu, déšť a kouř
duníc, ječíc rozbíjí se nesmírného vodstva bouř.
(Svatopluk Čech, Písně otroka)

See also
Glossary of poetry terms

References 

Types of verses